Christopher Cardozo (February 27, 1948 – February 21, 2021) was an American art collector, curator, photographer, author and publisher.

Cardozo’s Oaxaca series was first exhibited in 1971 at the Minneapolis Art Institution and later acquired by MOMA and other museums for their permanent collections.

He is known as an authority on the photography of Edward S. Curtis.  He has written and edited nine monographs on Edward Curtis and his photography. In the past forty years, Cardozo has exhibited around the world, focusing on his goal to bring Edward Curtis to the world.

Cardozo was the founder and Board Chair of the Edward S. Curtis Foundation, which is dedicated to preserving and exhibiting the work of Edward Curtis. He started collecting Curtis' photographs in the 1970s, and had a large personal collection of the photographer's work, which he exhibited in travelling displays and at his gallery, Christopher Cardozo Fine Art.

Bibliography 
Edward S. Curtis: One Hundred Masterworks (2015) Christopher Cardozo; Contributors Michael Tobias, Eric Jolly and A.D. Coleman
Native Nations: First North Americans as Seen by Edward Curtis (1993) Christopher Cardozo; foreword by George Horse-Capture
Chiefs and Warriors (Native Nations Series) (1996) Christopher Cardozo
Great Plains (Native Nations Series) (1996) Christopher Cardozo
Native Family (Native Nations Series) (1996) Christopher Cardozo
Hidden Faces (Native Nations Series) (1996) Christopher Cardozo
Sacred Legacy: Edward S. Curtis And The North American Indian (2000) Christopher Cardozo; foreword by Joseph Horse Capture and N. Scott Momaday
Edward S. Curtis: The Great Warriors (2004) Christopher Cardozo; Contributors Hartman Lomawaima and Anne Makepeace
Edward S. Curtis: The Women (2005) Christopher Cardozo; Contributors Louise Erdrich and Anne Makepeace

References 

1948 births
2021 deaths
20th-century American writers
21st-century American writers
American art collectors
American photographers
Place of birth missing
Place of death missing